Greek Radical Movement (Greek: Ελληνικό Ριζοσπαστικό Κίνημα) was a Greek political party founded by Antonis Tritsis on May 19, 1989. It continued to exist until April 1992.

Antonis Tritsis left the Panhellenic Socialist Movement because of the George Koskotas scandal. In the 1989 June elections the party was received 4,162 votes and gained 0.1%. In the European election of 1989 the party gained 0.62%.

The next year, in the local elections of 1990, Antonis Tritsis decided to run for the Municipality of Athens. He send a letter to the leaders of all political parties and asked their support. On October 14, 1990, Tritsis elected Mayor of Athens as the leader of a coalition between New Democracy and Greek Radical Movement.

Antonis Tritsis died after a stroke in April 1992. After his death the party was dissolved.

Political parties established in 1989
Defunct political parties in Greece